Nick McCormick (born 11 September 1981, in Hexham) is a British long distance runner.

Achievements

References 
 

1981 births
Living people
Sportspeople from Hexham
English male long-distance runners
Athletes (track and field) at the 2006 Commonwealth Games
Athletes (track and field) at the 2012 Summer Olympics
Olympic athletes of Great Britain
Commonwealth Games competitors for England